Mustafa Ahmad Abdul-Amir  (born January 1, 1991, in Iraq) is an Iraqi football striker. He currently plays for the Najaf FC football club in Iraq.

Honours

Country
 2013 World Men's Military Cup: Champions

External links
Profile on Goalzz.com

Iraqi footballers
1991 births
Living people
Al-Zawraa SC players
Erbil SC players
Amanat Baghdad players
Association football forwards
Iraq international footballers